Vailoa (Vailoa i Palauli) is a village on the island of Savaiʻi in Samoa. Vailoa is the capital of Palauli district on the south east of the island. The population is 784.

Vailoa attained the status of Pule (traditional political authority) sometime in the 19th century. The village is associated with the chiefly title of Lilomaiava. It is referred to as Vailoa i Palauli (Vailoa in Palau district).

Like most villages in Samoa, the local economy is based on subsistence living. The people live off their land from crops grown in plantations behind the village or fishing.

Customary land claim
In recent years, village chiefs have been involved in a legal claim for customary land lost during the German era of Samoan colonialism. The dispute dates back to 1886 when customary land was sold to the family of Olaf Frederick Nelson. The village claims that the land is custom held and was never lawfully alienated and couldn't therefore become freehold. In 2008, the Samoa Court of Appeal turned down the claim for the second time.

The disputed land includes an area known in modern times as the Nelson Plantation where extensive prehistoric settlement remains and monuments have been surveyed and studied, including Pulemelei Mound.

Notable people
Uale Mai, from Vailoa village, is a rugby union player and a former captain of the Samoa Sevens team and one of the great players in the international sport. He is the only Samoan to be awarded the IRB International Sevens Player of the Year which he received for the 2005–06 World Sevens Series.
 Marina Alofagia McCartney, is the granddaughter of Sevai Leleisi'uao from Vailoa, Palauli and Asiata Leaoa Lameko from Pitonu'u, Satupa'itea. Her Mother is Tavu'i Mapuni Leaoa from Pitonu'u, Satupa'itea and Stuart Stanley McCartney from Newcastle upon Tyne, England. She was Miss New Zealand 1997 and placed 15th in Miss Universe 1997. She is now an award-winning writer and director (Vai, Milk & Honey) and academic.

References

Populated places in Palauli